The Lorteburn or Langbourne is a lost stream or river, which ran in the east of the City of London, arising near to Aldgate, flowing south near to the Tower of London, and discharging into the River Thames. The stream appears to have been covered over or dry by the early 14th century but its course has been discovered during archaeological digs in the area and the water shed can be traced in the street level contours of that part of the city as mapped by Kelsey in 1841. The stream gave its name to the Langbourn ward of the city. The river is seldom included on maps or lists of London's lost rivers, and its existence is denied by Nicholas Barton, in his 1962 book Lost Rivers of London, but in more recent work David Bentley argues for its existence.

Toponymy 
The name Lorteburn is attested in a deed of 1288, when the stream was still extant. The name Langbourne is attested in Stow in 1603, when it had been dry for nearly two centuries.

In English River Names, Eilert Ekwall identifies several instances of Lorteburn. He gives the derivation as from an Old English word meaning dirt or filth. Related to the Old Norse lortr ("excrement, faeces"), this implies a dirty or filthy stream, possibly one used for a sewer. 

There is a second possibility given by Ekwall, a derivation from either the brook name Hlōra, or the mythical Norse female name Hlóra. The brook name derived from the Old English hlōwan meaning "The roaring one". This implies a swift stream with foaming water. This derivation may seem unlikely given the short length of the stream, but the watercourse was steep, and 'roaring' does correspond with Stow's description.

Burn or Bourne is a standard name for smaller streams and river, common in the area of London, for example the nearby rivers Ravensbourne, Tyburn and Westbourne. In place names it normally means 'stream'.

Archaeological evidence 
In 1981, David Bentley assembled evidence for the stream's existence, relying on archaeological and map evidence, especially in the records of the Museum of London. He first points out there is a shallow linear valley in that part of the city, first identified by Richard Kelsey's topographical survey in 1841. The topography of this part of London has been changed almost beyond recognition since the 1841 survey, especially by the construction of the London, Tilbury and Southend Railway and its terminus at Fenchurch Street railway station, and thus this valley can no longer be seen in the modern contours. 

Bentley then goes on to provide detailed evidence for the Lorteburn's existence. Archaeological evidence has identified dried stream beds in this part of the city. Discoveries include:
 Mariner House, Crutched Friars (Peter Marsden 1963-4) a small stream in the natural gravels, on an east to west alignment.
 2-4 Jewry Street (Peter Rowsome 1980)  a stream in a section cutting through the natural brickearth, on a north to south  alignment.
 Rangoon Street (David Bowler 1982) two stream-beds were observed following differing courses.

Bentley interprets this evidence as a stream called the Lorteburn recorded east of Seething Lane in the late 13th century.

Early references 
Bentley has identified that:

A very different course is described in 1603 by John Stow, giving the name as 'Langborne' and describing the route as running along Fenchurch Street, Lombard Street, and Sherbourn Lane. Stow states that the river gave its name to the Langbourn ward of the City of London. The stream was either covered over or dry by his time.

In 1770 John Noorthouck gives a similar description to Stow, with some additional details.

The church of St Katherine Coleman is indeed at the head of the course of the Lorteburn described by Bentley, but the rest of Stow and Noorthuck's descriptions are problematic given that they would require the water to flow uphill in the vicinity of Mincing Lane (see below).

Nicholas Barton's disbelief 
The 1962 book Lost Rivers of London by Nicholas Barton is considered by many to be the foundational work on London rivers. Barton refutes the existence of the Langbourne for three reasons:
 "It does not fit in with the contours, and actually involves the proposed stream's flowing uphill to the extent of three feet, both in the ancient and modern ground levels." 
 "During the construction of the Gracechurch Street sewer the builders specifically looked for it and found no traces."
 "Stow more or less admits that he himself has nothing more to go on than the name."
Barton's denial of the stream thus rests on Stowe's description, which describes a route far to the west of the one proposed by Bentley.

Inclusion on modern maps 
The Lorteburn is included on some modern maps of Roman Londinium and early Medieval London.
  
    
  
 The above map is reproduced online as the Medieval London, 1270 - 1300 layer of Layers of London at https://www.layersoflondon.org/map/overlays/medieval-london-1270-1300 
 The Archaeology of Greater London online map produced by MOLA (Museum of London Archaeology) and regularly updated at https://molarchaeology.maps.arcgis.com/apps/MapSeries/index.html?appid=9a85640effc042ae91af6b0d43abbafb (The Lorteburn is visible on the Prehistoric, Roman and Saxon views.)

Notes 

Rivers of London